Mornay-Berry is a commune in the Cher department in the Centre-Val de Loire region of France.

Geography

Population

Sights
 The church of St. Sulpice, dating from the twelfth century
 The thirteenth-century castle de Grand-Cour.

See also
Communes of the Cher department

References

Communes of Cher (department)